Lakhovsky is a Russian surname. Notable people with the surname include:

Arnold Lakhovsky (1880–1937), Russian-Ukrainian landscape painter
Georges Lakhovsky (1870–1942), Russian engineer, scientist, author, and inventor

See also
Lyakhovsky (disambiguation)

Russian-language surnames